Mackinac Island State Park is a state park located on Mackinac Island in the U.S. state of Michigan.  A Lake Huron island, it is near the Straits of Mackinac. The island park encompasses , which is approximately 80% of the island's total area.  The park is also within the boundaries of the city of Mackinac Island and has permanent residents within its boundaries.  M-185 circles the perimeter of the park as the only motorless highway in the state due to the island's ban of automobiles.  The park is governed by the Michigan Department of Natural Resources and the Mackinac Island State Park Commission.  On July 15, 2009, the park celebrated its 20 millionth visitor.

The park was first established as Mackinac National Park in 1875, which was the second national park established in the United States after Yellowstone National Park. In 1895, it was transferred to state control and reorganized as Mackinac Island State Park, which was the first state park in Michigan. The park contains many important historical and geological features, such as Fort Mackinac, Fort Holmes, other historic buildings, historic sites, limestone caves, and other unique rock formations.  The park also operates the Mackinac Island Airport.  Many of these sites are formally operated by the Mackinac Island State Park Commission, which also operates two other parks around the Straits of Mackinac area: Colonial Michilimackinac and Historic Mill Creek Discovery Park.

War of 1812 
Mackinac Island played an important role in the War of 1812 between the United States and Canada (then a British colony).  Fort Mackinac, upon the island, was built by the British army during the Revolutionary War.  The British later relinquished the fort to the Americans in 1796, but then built and maintained a similar fort on nearby St. Joseph Island.  The two nations used their island forts in a struggle to maintain supremacy over the waters of northern Lake Huron.  As one of the opening actions of the War of 1812, the British captured Fort Mackinac and maintained it as a British stronghold until the end of the war.  An American attempt to recapture the fort in 1814 failed in the Battle of Mackinac Island.  When the war ended with the Treaty of Ghent in 1815, the island was returned to American control.

History

National park
Mackinac National Park on March 3, 1875 was designed by Congress as the country's second national park after Yellowstone. Mackinac-born US Senator Thomas Ferry introduced the bill to do so after the Yellowstone designation. He argued that the active military personnel station there, as the island was then mostly a military reservation, would do double duty as caretakers of the island, which helped convince other congressmen. The park was placed within the United States Department of War.

With the leased parcel revenue plan in 1888, the fort was able to build trails, improve roads, and even put up an observation tower on the island's highest point at Fort Holmes.

The War Department decommissioned the fort given its lack of military strategic importance in 1890. With the decommissioning, the troops were moved off the island leaving no one to care for the park. The department suggested a sale of the park.

A grassroots lobbying campaign led in September 1895 for the U.S. government to turn over the park and fort to the State of Michigan. The state legislature established the Mackinac Island State Park Commission to manage the park and its structures as the first state park, Mackinac Island State Park.

Information centers
Soldiers' Barracks
Visitor Center
Mackinac Island Tourism Bureau

Historic areas

Historic buildings

Fort Mackinac - museum
Fort Holmes  
Mission Church - museum
Mission House
American Fur Company Retail Store & Dr. Beaumont Museum - museum
Matthew Geary House
Benjamin Blacksmith Shop - museum
Biddle House - museum
Governor's Mansion (Lawrence Andrew Young Cottage)
 Richard and Jane Manoogian Mackinac Art Museum - formerly Indian Dormitory 
McGulpin House - museum

Sites
Battlefield of 1814
British Landing
Cemeteries
Lime Kiln
Marquette Park
Wawashkamo Golf Club

Caves and rock formations

Arch Rock
Gitchi Manitou
Sugar Loaf
Cave of the Woods
Crack-in-the-Island
Eagle Point Cave
Skull Cave
Friendship's Altar
Sunset Rock (sometimes called Chimney Rock)
Devil's Kitchen
Robinson's Folly

Installations
Anne's Tablet

Gallery

Mackinac State Historic Parks
Mackinac State Historic Parks is an agency within the Michigan Department of Natural Resources lead by the Mackinac Island State Park Commission. The Parks consist of several parks, museum and other historical areas in the Straits of Mackinac area with the major groups includes Mackinac Island State Park, Michilimackinac State Park and Historic Mill Creek Discovery Park in Mackinaw City.

The agency is governed by the Mackinac Island State Park Commission, a seven-member body. The commissioner are appointed by the governor to six year terms with confirmation by the Michigan Senate.

While a national park, the park was first overseen by the park superintendent, who was also the fort commander. With the  military not wanting to fund the park, being non-military, and the National Park Service not formed until 1916, the department approved a revenue plan by a captain at the fort in which choice parcels would be leased to resorters to build summer cottages  which started in 1885.

When the park was turned over to the State of Michigan in 1895 to become the first state park, the state legislature established the Mackinac Island State Park Commission to manage the park and its structures.

Areas and attractions
Mackinac Island State Park, Mackinac Island
Fort Mackinac
Historic Downtown Mackinac 
The Richard and Jane Manoogian Mackinac Art Museum
Michilimackinac State Park
Colonial Michilimackinac
Old Mackinac Point Lighthouse
Historic Mill Creek Discovery Park, in Mackinaw City

References

External links
Mackinac Island State Park
Mackinac Island Insider Tips, Mackinac Island: A True Gem.
Mackinac Island Tourism Bureau Website

 
Protected areas established in 1875
Archaeological sites in Michigan
State parks of Michigan
Museums in Mackinac County, Michigan
Protected areas of Mackinac County, Michigan
Historic district contributing properties in Michigan
National Register of Historic Places in Mackinac County, Michigan
Parks on the National Register of Historic Places in Michigan
Former national parks of the United States